Cyrtodactylus chrysopylos is a species of gecko that is endemic to Pyadalin Cave Wildlife Sanctuary, Shan State in Myanmar.

References 

Cyrtodactylus
Reptiles described in 2003